Karina the Dancer (French:La maison du Maltais) is a 1928 French silent film directed by Henri Fescourt and starring Marie-Louise Vois, Sylvio De Pedrelli, Louis Vonelly. The film is based on a novel by Jean Vignaud.

Cast
 Marie-Louise Vois as Safia  
 Sylvio De Pedrelli as Matteo  
 Louis Vonelly as Jeweller  
 Jeanne Marnier 
 Lydia Zaréna 
 André Nicolle 
 Paul Francheschi 
 Bonaventura Ibáñez as Old Maltese
 Nita Alvarez    
 Simone d'A-Lal  
 Jean Godaret

References

Bibliography
 Goble, Alan. The Complete Index to Literary Sources in Film. Walter de Gruyter, 1999.

External links

1928 films
French silent films
1920s French-language films
Films directed by Henri Fescourt
French black-and-white films
1920s French films